Samantha Stosur was the defending champion and top seed, but she was eliminated by Kimiko Date-Krumm in the quarterfinals 5–7, 6–3, 7–6(7–4). Tamarine Tanasugarn won the title 7–5, 6–7(4–7), 6–1 by defeating the 40-year-old Date-Krumm in the final. With Tanasugarn herself being 33 years old, it was the oldest known final (73 years combined) in the history of women's tennis.

Seeds

Draw

Finals

Top half

Bottom half

References

External links
 Main Draw
 Qualifying Draw

Hp Open - Singles
2010 HP Open